Rafael Gutiérrez may refer to:
Rafael Antonio Gutiérrez (1845–1921), president of El Salvador
Rafael Garza Gutiérrez (1896–1974), Mexican football player and coach
Rafael López Gutiérrez (1855–1924), president of Honduras
Rafael de Izquierdo y Gutíerrez (1820–1882), Governor General of the Philippines
Rafael Gutiérrez Girardot (1928-2005), Colombian philosopher

Rafael Ricardo Gutiérrez (1980-   Present), Privet Military Contractor and American Business Man